Abel E. Leavenworth (September 3, 1828 – June 3, 1901) was an American educator and soldier.

Life and career
Abel Edgar Leavenworth was born 3 September 1828 in Charlotte, Vermont, son of Abel and Anna (Hickok) Leavenworth. He obtained his early education at the district schools of Madrid, New York and Charlotte and continued his studies at Hinesburgh Academy. Afterwards, he entered the University of Vermont, from which he graduated in 1856. He began his career as a teacher in 1846, taught district schools and eventually became the principal of the Bolivar Academy, Bolivar, Missouri, and the academies of Hinesburgh, Brattleboro, and New Haven. In 1870 he secured the incorporation and endowment of Beeman Academy at New Haven, the position of principal of which, he resigned in 1874 to become principal of the State Normal School at Randolph.

He left the Normal School at Randolph in 1879 and spent two years in institute work and the collection of a large cabinet of fossils and minerals. In 1881 he purchased the school building and equipment of the Rutland County grammar school, and was appointed principal of the State Normal School at Castleton (now Castleton University).

At the age of twelve he united with the Congregational church, serving as deacon and delegate to county associations and state conventions. He was one of the founders of the Delta Psi fraternity at the University of Vermont, and in early life was an active member of the Masons, Odd Fellows, Sons of Temperance, and the International Order of Good Templars, having been presiding officer in each, as also in various county and state teachers' organizations, and later in the Grand Army of the Republic, from which body he was a delegate-at-large from Vermont at the twenty-fifth national encampment at Detroit in August 1891. He was also a member of the American Academy of Political and Social Science from the first year of its organization.

On 14 September 1853 Abel Edgar Leavenworth was married to Mary Evelina, daughter of Samuel and Sally (Hubbard) Griggs, of Cazenovia, New York. Their children were: Anna Maria, Francis Abel, Samuel Edgar, Clarence Greenman, William Stowell, Emily Reynolds, and Philip Reynolds. Mary Evelina (Griggs) Leavenworth died 30 July 1877. Following her death, Abel Edgar Leavenworth married Lucy Elizabeth, daughter of Marcus N. and Julia M. (Burt) Wadsworth, of Oswego, New York.

Civil War service
Abel E. Leavenworth was a veteran of the American Civil War, and soon after his enlistment as a private in Company K, Ninth Regiment Vermont Volunteers, was promoted through the ranks of sergeant and first lieutenant to that of captain. He was made assistant inspector general of Isaac J. Wistar’s brigade of the U. S. forces on York Peninsula, of the Second division of the Eighteenth army corps, and of the provisional brigade at Bermuda Hundred, Virginia. He also served as assistant adjutant general of the last named command, later of the Second brigade, Third division, Twenty-fourth army corps, and led the skirmish line into the city of Richmond on 3 April 1865. He was appointed assistant provost marshal of that city, and subsequently assistant adjutant general of the district of Appomattox. He was mustered out of the service at Richmond on 13 June 1865, having received highly commendatory letters from the generals on whose staff he had served.

References

1828 births
1901 deaths
People of Vermont in the American Civil War
Castleton State College faculty
People from Charlotte, Vermont
University of Vermont alumni
Educators from Vermont
Sons of Temperance